Epifanije Stefanović was the alleged Serbian Orthodox Archbishop of Dalmatia, who in 1648 entered communion with the Catholic Church, mentioned only by Venetian ecclesiastical historian Daniele Farlati (1690–1773). According to research of Serbian Orthodox bishop Nikodim Milaš (1845–1915), the entry was proved to be a hoax.

Life
According to Daniele Farlati (1690–1773), during the Cretan War (1645–69), in November 1648, Archbishop Stefanović and two of his bishops, Vasilije and Isaija, and 80 (or 800) monks entered communion with the Catholic Church, thanks to a Franciscan. This has been refuted by the research of Nikodim Milaš (1845–1915), as, firstly, history knows of no such archbishop, and secondly, the Orthodox community at that time strongly resisted Catholic propaganda, supporting the Serbian Patriarch Maksim I through the emissary monk Kiril.

According to Mile Bogović, the current Catholic bishop of Gospić-Senj, after the subsequent death of Stefanović, the monks turned against the Catholic Church, thus the Uniatism of these Dalmatian Serbs failed.

See also 
Catholic Church in Serbia

References

17th-century Serbian people
17th-century Eastern Orthodox bishops 
17th-century Eastern Catholic bishops
Bishops of the Serbian Orthodox Church
History of the Serbian Orthodox Church in Croatia
Eparchy of Dalmatia
Serbs of Croatia
17th-century deaths
Date of birth unknown
Converts to Eastern Catholicism from Eastern Orthodoxy
Former Serbian Orthodox Christians
Serbian Eastern Catholics
Venetian period in the history of Croatia
Religious hoaxes
18th-century hoaxes